Blair Drummond is a small rural community  northwest of Stirling in the Stirling district of Scotland, predominantly located along the A84 road. Lying to the north of the River Forth, the community is within the registration county of Perthshire and the civil parish of Kincardine

History 
A former resident of Blairdrummond House was enlightenment thinker Lord Kames whose wife inherited the house in 1766. Lord Kames began the transformation of the carse area of Blair Drummond; turning it from an often water-laden moss into productive agricultural land, which brought him an income of almost £2000 per year.

Blair Drummond House was entirely rebuilt in 1868-72 by James Campbell Walker (under instruction from George Stirling Home Drummond FRSE) and again by James Bow Dunn after a fire in 1921-23 and is now  a home for adults with learning disabilities run by the Camphill Movement.

Four gold Iron Age torcs, known as the Stirling torcs, were found in Blair Drummond in 2009 and are now in the Museum of Scotland.

Facilities 
Blair Drummond has a local authority primary school - Kincardine in Mentieth Primary School, a Church of Scotland church, and a community hall which was rebuilt in 2005. Blair Drummond is also the location of the Blair Drummond Safari Park, and a caravan park housed in the old walled garden of Blair Drummond House.

The Community 
Many of the residents of Blair Drummond are farmers, although others commute to Stirling, Edinburgh and Glasgow. Blair Drummond is in the Stirling council area, although in the past it was part of Perthshire. Other communities bordering Blair Drummond are Gargunnock, Thornhill, Deanston, Doune and Dunblane. A community council covers both Thornhill and Blair Drummond, and the 2001 census for the area covered by the Thornhill and Blairdrummond Community Council put the population for the areas at 1,109.

Notable people from Blair Drummond
 Henry Home, Lord Kames - 18th century Scottish philosopher and writer
 Henry Home-Drummond
 George Stirling Home Drummond
 William Downie Stewart Sr - 19th century New Zealand politician

References

External links

Vision of Britain - Blair Drummond

Populated places in Stirling (council area)
Inventory of Gardens and Designed Landscapes